Charles Taschereau Beard (July 30, 1890 – November 21, 1950) was a naval officer and politician in British Columbia. He represented Esquimalt in the Legislative Assembly of British Columbia from 1945 to 1948 as a Liberal.

He was born in Ottawa, the son of Frank Beard, and, at the age of 17, served two years aboard the British Merchant Training ship Conway. He then served aboard several Canadian fisheries patrol vessels. In 1909, Beard joined the Royal Naval Reserve and, in 1910, the Royal Canadian Navy. He served as senior naval officer at Esquimalt and as Commanding Officer and as Commander of the Dockyard at Naden. In October 1915, he married Kathleen Kemp. He served as commander of Maritime Forces Pacific in 1922. At the start of World War II, Beard came out of retirement to command , which captured the German merchant freighter Weser off the coast of Mexico. He later retired due to poor health. Beard was a member of the Liberal-Conservative coalition in the provincial assembly. He died on November 21, 1950 and was buried with full military honours.

References 

British Columbia Liberal Party MLAs
Royal Canadian Navy officers
1890 births
1950 deaths
Politicians from Ottawa
Canadian military personnel of World War II
Royal Naval Reserve personnel